Erika Jane Christensen (born August 19, 1982) is an American actress and singer whose filmography includes roles in Traffic (2000), Swimfan (2002), The Banger Sisters (2002), The Perfect Score (2004), Flightplan (2005), How to Rob a Bank (2007), The Tortured (2010), and The Case for Christ (2017). For her performance in Traffic, she won the MTV Movie Award for Breakthrough Female Performance and the Screen Actors Guild Award for Outstanding Performance by a Cast in a Motion Picture along with her co-stars.

In 2006, she starred on the short-lived drama series Six Degrees on ABC. From 2010 until its ending in 2015, Christensen starred as Julia Braverman-Graham on the NBC family drama series Parenthood. In 2014, she won a Gracie Award for her performance in the role. Christensen portrayed Betty Beaumontaine on ABC's short-lived crime drama series Wicked City.

Early life
Christensen was born in Seattle, Washington, the daughter of Kathy (née Hendricks), a construction manager, and Steven Christensen, an insurance worker and human resources executive. She has an older half-brother, Nick, and two younger twin brothers, Dane (who appeared in the 2005 film The Upside of Anger) and Brando. She has Danish, Icelandic, Swedish, Norwegian, Welsh, and Irish ancestry.

Christensen lived in Seattle until age four, when her family relocated to suburban Los Angeles, California. She started out acting on television in commercials for McDonald's and Volvo. Christensen is a member of the Church of Scientology. Her parents became Scientologists in their 20s while living in Seattle, and raised her as a Scientologist. Her parents also decided to home school her.

Career

1997–2006: Beginnings
Christensen began her professional career with a supporting role in the comedy film Leave It to Beaver, and a one-episode guest appearance on the drama series Nothing Sacred, both of which were released/aired in 1997. She went on to guest star in numerous other television series in the late 1990s, including Frasier, The Practice, 3rd Rock from the Sun, and Touched by an Angel. She also starred in the Disney Channel original movie Can of Worms in 1999. Also in 1999, she starred as Abigail Winthrop on the short-lived CBS sitcom Thanks. That same year, she featured in Michael Jackson's music video for his song "Childhood", alongside actress Jena Malone.

For her performance as cocaine user Caroline Wakefield in Steven Soderbergh's crime drama film Traffic (2000), she received the awards for Breakthrough Female Performance at the MTV Movie Awards, Standout Performance – Female at the Young Hollywood Awards, and Outstanding Performance by a Cast in a Motion Picture at the Screen Actors Guild Awards. Also in 2000, Christensen guest starred in single episodes of Time of Your Life, Movie Stars, FreakyLinks, and The Pretender. In 2001, she had a recurring role on the sitcom The Geena Davis Show. She also appeared in an episode of the Fox sitcom That '70s Show, reuniting her with her Traffic co-star Topher Grace. She was named one of People "Breakthrough Stars of 2001". The following year, Christensen starred in three feature films: the teen thriller Swimfan, the crime drama Home Room, and the comedy The Banger Sisters.

In 2003, Christensen starred in MTV's television film adaptation of Wuthering Heights, based on the Emily Brontë novel of the same name. She also recorded multiple songs for the film's soundtrack. In 2004, she starred in the teen heist film The Perfect Score, and the horror film Riding the Bullet. In 2005, Christensen recorded a version of "Let's Fall in Love" with John Stevens for his debut album Red. Also in 2005, Christensen co-starred in the films The Upside of Anger as Andy Wolfmeyer, co-starring Kevin Costner and Joan Allen; The Sisters as Irene Prior, with Maria Bello and Elizabeth Banks; and Flightplan as Fiona, starring Jodie Foster. The following year, she starred in the series Six Degrees, which debuted on the ABC fall schedule on September 21, 2006. Low ratings caused its cancellation after one season, leaving five episodes unaired.

2007–2015: Parenthood
In 2007, she appeared in the comedy-drama film Gardener of Eden, and the independent crime comedy How to Rob a Bank. In 2008 and 2009, she guest starred as a special agent on Law & Order: Special Victims Unit, a college student with dissociative identity disorder on Lie to Me, and a victim of domestic abuse on Mercy. Christensen made a cameo in the Joaquin Phoenix-directed music video "Tired of Being Sorry" for Balthazar Getty's band Ringside. In 2009, she was part of the cast of the film adaptation of Veronika Decides to Die, and starred in the romantic drama Mercy alongside James Caan and Dylan McDermott. In 2010, Christensen co-starred with Jesse Metcalfe in the horror-thriller film The Tortured.

Christensen was a regular cast member on the NBC drama television series Parenthood, which debuted on March 2, 2010, and concluded on January 29, 2015. She portrayed the role of Julia Braverman-Graham, the youngest daughter of the Braverman family. She won the 2014 Gracie Award for Outstanding Female Actor in a Supporting Role in a Drama Series for her performance in the series. In 2013, she starred in the musical film How Sweet It Is, directed by Brian Herzlinger, and was a guest judge on 2 episodes of the cooking competition series Knife Fight. The following year, she appeared on the celebrity game show Hollywood Game Night, and lead the cast of the Hallmark Channel television film My Boyfriends' Dogs, based on the Dandi Daley Mackall novel of the same name.

In February 2015, she was cast in the short-lived ABC crime drama series Wicked City as Betty Beaumontaine, a single mother who becomes romantically involved with a serial killer. Also in 2015, she partnered with food company Lean Cuisine to launch their brand overhaul. In September 2015, Christensen was among several celebrities to appear in the music video "Love" for Dash Mihok's band Diz and the Fam.

2016–present
Christensen led the cast of the Hallmark Channel television film Anything for Love co-starring with Paul Greene. The film was released on February 14, 2016. The following month, she starred in the music video "All Is Forgiven" for Sal Masekela's band Alekesam. Christensen next appeared as part of the all-star cast of HBO's courtroom drama film Confirmation, directed by Rick Famuyiwa and co-starring Kerry Washington, Wendell Pierce, and Greg Kinnear. The same year, Christensen starred in Jon Abrahams' directorial debut film Two for One, which had its world premiere at the Napa Valley Film Festival.

In 2017, she co-starred with Mike Vogel and Robert Forster in the Lee Strobel biopic The Case for Christ, in the role of Strobel's wife Leslie. That same year, Christensen began starring as Ali Petrovich in the ABC drama series Ten Days in the Valley, alongside Kyra Sedgwick. She starred in Jon Abrahams' second film, the comedy mob thriller Clover, alongside Mark Webber, Julia Jones, and Ron Perlman.

Personal life
In November 2014, Christensen became engaged to cyclist Cole Maness. They married on September 5, 2015, in Palm Springs, California, and reside in Los Feliz, Los Angeles. The couple have two daughters, born in June 2016 and August 2018.

Filmography

Film

Television

Music videos

Awards and nominations

References

Works cited

External links

 
 Photo Essay of Erika Christensen for Left Field Project by Duane Fernandez

1982 births
20th-century American actresses
21st-century American actresses
Actresses from Los Angeles
Actresses from Seattle
American film actresses
American television actresses
American child actresses
American Scientologists
American people of Icelandic descent
American people of Swedish descent
American people of Danish descent
American people of Norwegian descent
American people of Welsh descent
American people of Irish descent
Living people
Outstanding Performance by a Cast in a Motion Picture Screen Actors Guild Award winners
People from Los Feliz, Los Angeles